The 1991 Ogwr Borough Council election was held on Thursday 2 May 1991 to Ogwr Borough Council, a district council in Mid Glamorgan, Wales. It took place on the same day as other council elections in Wales and England. These were to be the last elections before re-organization of local government in Wales and dissolution of the council.

The previous full election took place in 1987.

Overview
These were the last elections to Ogwr Borough Council before local government reorganisation, which would see new unitary local authorities created in Wales from 1 April 1996. Elections to the new Bridgend County Borough Council would take place in May 1995.

Results for only fifteen of the twenty nine electoral wards were confirmed overnight, with the remainder of the wards having their results announced on the Friday. Leader of the Conservatives on the council, David Unwin, was one of the first to retain his seat, coming top of the poll in Coity Higher.

49 council seats were up for election, a similar number to the previous election in 1987.

Election result

|}

Ward Results
Contests took place in 21 of the 29 wards, with councillors in eight of the wards being elected unopposed.(a)

Bettws (one seat)

Blackmill (one seat)

Blaengarw (one seat)

Brackla (one seat)

Caerau (two seats)

Cefn Cribwr (one seat)

Coity Higher (two seats)

Cornelly (two seats)

Coychurch Lower (one seat)

Laleston (three seats)

Llangeinor (one seat)

Llangynwyd (one seat)

Maesteg East (two seats)

Maesteg West (two seats)

Morfa (two seats)

Nantyffyllon (one seat)

Nant-y-moel (one seat)

Newcastle (two seats)

Newcastle Higher (one seat)

Ogmore Vale (one seat)

Oldcastle (two seats)

Pencoed (three seats)

Pontycymmer (one seat)

Porthcawl East (three seats)

Porthcawl West (four seats)

The Conservatives in Porthcawl had fallen out with one another, leading to seven candidates vying for the four seats.

Pyle (three seats)

St Brides Major (one seat)

St Brides Minor (two seats) 

Mel Winter, a ward councillor since 1983, had been de-selected as a Labour candidate. He stood and won as an independent.

Ynysawdre (one seat) 

(a) Elections Centre source compares the percentage vote of the lead candidate for each party in the ward. It also indicates which candidates are female. It indicates which candidates are sitting councillors standing for re-election

* retiring councillor in the ward standing for re-election

References

Ogwr 1991
Ogwr